Tapari (Nepali: टपरी) is a leaf plate used in Nepal in traditional feasts, marriages and religious rituals to serve food or as a container to offer food and other items to the gods. Tapari is nowadays also used in urban fast food stalls in cities like Kathmandu.

Tapari is made from mature green leaves of Shorea robusta (sal tree). Leaves are gathered and stitched together with fine bamboo sticks called sinkaa. Traditionally, women in the house build Tapari. It requires practice and skill to build Tapari. 

There are three types of leaf plates/utensils. Tapari is the biggest of all, is curved and made of green Sal tree leaves. Duna is a bowl designed to hold liquids much easily. Bota is a tiny bowl made of only one sal leaf.

Steps to build Tapari

References

Serving and dining
Leaves